Montataire is a railway station located in the French municipality of Montataire, (Oise). The station is served by TER Hauts-de-France (Beauvais - Creil line).

References
 

Railway stations in Oise